Gregory Michael Sarris (born February 12, 1952) is the Chairman of the Federated Indians of Graton Rancheria (since 1992), the Graton Rancheria Endowed Chair in Creative Writing and Native American Studies at Sonoma State University, where he teaches classes in Native American Literature, American Literature, and Creative Writing. He is also President of the Graton Economic Development Authority. 
 
Sarris has authored six books, the best known of which is Grand Avenue, a collection of autobiographical short stories about contemporary Native American life. Named after a real place in Santa Rosa's South Park district, Sarris was a co-executive producer of a two-part 1996 HBO miniseries adaptation, shot entirely on location.

Childhood
Greg Sarris was adopted shortly after his birth by a middle-class white couple, George and Mary Sarris, who believed they could not have children. Shortly after, they conceived the first of three biological children, which complicated life at home with his alcoholic father. Sarris was frequently the target of his father's abuse. In an effort to keep him out of harm's way, he was sent to live with various white and American Indian foster families. At the age of 12, Sarris met Pomo basket weaver Mabel McKay, who taught him about American Indian customs and tradition. According to Sarris, McKay's guidance provided him with a sense of purpose.

Education
After graduating from Santa Rosa High School in 1970, Sarris attended Santa Rosa Junior College. In 1977 he graduated summa cum laude with a BA in English from UCLA. He went on to complete his graduate studies at Stanford University, earning a master's degree in creative writing in 1981 and a Ph.D. in Modern Thought and Literature in 1989.

Career
 1989-2001 English professor, UCLA.
 2001-2005 Fletcher Jones Professor of Creative Writing and Literature at Loyola Marymount University.
 Endowed Chair in Native American Studies, Sonoma State University, 2005. 
 Consultant for Turner Broadcasting System on California Indians.
 Tribal Chairman of the Federated Indians of Graton Rancheria. 1992–Present. He is in his fifteenth elected term as Chairman of the Tribe.

Ancestry
Greg Sarris’ mother,  seventeen year old Mary Bernadette “Bunny” Hartman, of German, Jewish and Irish descent, came from a wealthy family. She was sent to Santa Rosa to deliver her child, which was not uncommon for unwed mothers at the time. She was inadvertently given the wrong blood type in a transfusion after giving birth, and died shortly thereafter. Sarris’ father was not named on the birth certificate. It wasn't until the early 1980s as a graduate student at Stanford that Sarris learned Emilio Arthur Hilario, of Filipino, Miwok and Pomo descent, was his biological father. According to Sarris, he learned the identity of his great great grandparents from his grandfather, Emiliano Hilario. Hilario's grandmother, Reinette Smith Sarragossa, was the daughter of Emily Stewart, a woman of mixed blood ancestry, and Tom Smith, a well-known healer of Pomo and Coastal Miwok blood.
	
Marilee Montgomery and Stop the Casino 101 Coalition dispute Sarris's claim to have Pomo and Miwok blood. Sarris was at the forefront of the controversial Graton Resort and Casino project which was strongly opposed by Stop the Casino 101 Coalition.

Activism
In the early 1990s, Sarris worked to have the Coast Miwok and Pomo Native Americans gain recognition as a tribe. He co-authored the Graton Rancheria Restoration Act, 25 U.S.C. §1300n (Act) with California Indian Legal Services. President Clinton signed the Act into law on December 27, 2000, officially granting the tribe status as a federally recognized tribe. The Act mandated that the Secretary of the Interior take land in the tribe's aboriginal territory of Marin or Sonoma Counties into trust as the Tribe's reservation.

Published works
Novels
 Watermelon Nights: A Novel, Hyperion (New York, NY), 1998; reissued 2021, University of Oklahoma Press.

Short story collections
 How A Mountain Was Made, Heyday (Berkeley, CA), 2017.
 Grand Avenue, Hyperion (New York, NY), 1994.
 (Editor and contributor) The Sound of Rattles and Clappers: A Collection of New California Indian Writing, University of Arizona Press (Tucson, AZ), 1994.

Nonfiction
 Keeping Slug Woman Alive: A Holistic Approach to American Indian Texts, University of California Press (Berkeley, CA), 1993.
 Mabel McKay: Weaving the Dream, University of California Press (Berkeley, CA), 1994.
 (Editor, with Connie A. Jacobs and James R. Giles) Approaches to Teaching the Works of Louise Erdrich, Modern Language Association of America (New York, NY), 2004.

Film and Theater
 Grand Avenue (television miniseries; based on his short story collection), Home Box Office, 1996.
 Wrote script for Mission Indians, a play directed by Nancy Benjamin and Margo Hall, 2001.
 Co-produced, advised, and was featured in a sixteen part series on American literature for public television called American Passages.

Awards and Achievements
 Induction to the American Academy of Arts and Sciences 
 Arts & Humanities Dean's Teaching Award, Sonoma State University 
 Santa Fe Film Festival Award, best screenplay, and American Indian Film Festival Award, 1996, for Grand Avenue;
 Best Reads Award, California Indian Booksellers, 1996;
 Bay Area Theater Critics Award, best play, 2002, for Mission Indians.   
 Walter J. Gores Award for Excellence in Teaching, 1988-1989
 University of California President's Postdoctoral Fellowship 1989-1991
 Associate Director of the UCLA American Indian Studies Center, 1991-1992.
 Appointed to the MLA Committee on the Literatures and Languages of America, 1992.

See also
List of writers from peoples indigenous to the Americas

Notes

References
 Lincoln, Kenneth. "Greg Sarris." Native American Writers of the United States. Ed. Kenneth M. Roemer. Detroit: Gale, 1997. Dictionary of Literary Biography Vol. 175. Literature Resource Center. Web. 21 May 2016.
 "Greg Sarris." Contemporary Authors Online. Detroit: Gale, 2007. Literature Resource Center. Web. 28 May 2016.
 Wasp, Jean. World Class Author, Screenwriter Greg Sarris Named to Native American Endowed Chair at SSU. Sonoma State University News Center. April 8, 2005. Web. 28 May 2016.
 "Tribal Government" Graton Rancheria.n.p.n.d.Web.28 May 2016. 
 greg-sarris.com. n.p. n.d. Web. 28 May 2016.
 Mason, Clark. Casino critic challenges tribal leader's Indian heritage . The Press Democrat. February 17, 2010. Web. 28 May 2016.
 Title XIV Graton Rancheria Restoration. uscode.house.gov. n.p. 27 Dec 2000. Web 28 May 2016.
 Federal Register Notice at 74 FR 40219. August 11, 2009. Web. 28 May 2016. 
 Sarris, Greg. Mabel McKay: Weaving the Dream Berkeley: University of California Press, 1994. ISN 0-520-20968-0.

Further reading
 Elvira Pulitano, Toward a Native American Critical Theory. 2005.  Sarris is one of six authors whose work is surveyed.
 Dictionary of Literary Biography, Volume 175: Native American Writers of the United States, Thomson Gale (Detroit, MI), 1997.
 Here First : Autobiographical Essays by Native American Writers. First American ed. (New York), 2000.

1952 births
American people of Filipino descent
American people of German descent
American people of Irish descent
American people of Jewish descent
American people who self-identify as being of Native American descent
Living people
Writers from Santa Rosa, California
Miwok people
Pomo people
Male actors from Santa Rosa, California
Native American leaders
Native American novelists
Native American academics
Sonoma State University faculty
University of California, Los Angeles faculty
20th-century American novelists
American male novelists
20th-century American male writers